Newermind: A Tribute to Nirvana is a 2011 celebratory tribute album, created by SPIN Magazine, for the 20th anniversary of Nirvana's album Nevermind. The bands that covered each song on the album were inspired by Nirvana to pursue a musical career, with special mentions to Meat Puppets and The Vaselines who had inspired Kurt Cobain. The album was originally released for free download on July 19, 2011. It is no longer available for download on the original website.

Track listing

References

2011 compilation albums
Nirvana (band) tribute albums